The Symphony No. 7 by Arnold Bax was completed in 1939 and dedicated to "The People of America". The work received its first performance in Carnegie Hall, New York City, by the New York Philharmonic on 10 June 1939 under the baton of Sir Adrian Boult.  It was commissioned by the British Council to be played at the 1939 New York World's Fair, along with Arthur Bliss's Piano Concerto in B-flat, and Ralph Vaughan Williams' Five Variants of Dives and Lazarus.

It is scored for piccolo, three flutes, two oboes, English horn, three clarinets, bass clarinet, two bassoons, double bassoon, four horns, three trumpets, three trombones, tuba, bass drum, tenor drum, snare drum, tambourine, cymbals, gong, triangle, glockenspiel, harp and strings.

It is in three movements:

Allegro – Poco largemente – Tempo I
Lento – Piu mosso. In Legendary Mood – Tempo I
Theme and Variations: Allegro – Andante – Tempo I – Epilogue (Sereno)

The first movement opens with a melodic motive from the clarinets, and the slower, second main motive is introduced almost immediately after (sounding like a quote from the Tragic Overture, Op. 81 by Johannes Brahms). These two motives form a basis for the first subject, which has a very haunting mood, almost looking back on the opening of the fifth symphony. The lyrical second subject is achingly tender, but does show signs of optimism, particularly when it recapitulates at the end of the movement.

The second movement is much more serene, almost a relief after the experience of the stormy opening movement. It is in a three part form, like a one movement symphony, and the mood is somewhat dignified. It closes peacefully to set up the finale.

The last movement is a theme and variations, something that Bax had not attempted before. After a blustery introduction, a theme is introduced, which is used for the variations. It closes with Bax's shortest epilogue, almost acting as an end to an his cycle of symphonies, as if to say "goodbye".

Symphonies by Arnold Bax
1939 compositions
Compositions in A-flat minor
Music with dedications